Ibekwe is a family name (surname) originating in Nigeria. It is a prevalent surname among the Igbo people.

Ibekwe may also refer to:
Kelechi Francis Ibekwe, professional footballer
Ekene Ibekwe, American-born Nigerian basketball player
Ify Ibekwe, American basketball player
Chinweizu Ibekwe
Chinyere Christy Ibekwe, American-born Nigerian basketball player, Beauty Queen, international fashion designer 

Igbo names
Surnames of Nigerian origin